"Is It True?" is a song by Icelandic singer Yohanna, the  entry in the Eurovision Song Contest 2009 in Moscow, Russia. The song was composed by Óskar Páll Sveinsson and won second place in the contest. The song was also recorded in Spanish ("Si te vas"), German ("War es nur"), Russian ("" / "Ya ne splyu") and French ("Si tu sais").

Yohanna performed the song in the first semi-final on 12 May 2009, where it came in first place with 174 points, qualifying for the final. In the final, the song came in second place overall with 218 points. That made it the most successful Icelandic song entry to the Eurovision contest since , when Selma placed second with the song "All Out of Luck."

"Is It True?" reached No. 1 in the Icelandic Singles Chart. It became a Top 10 hit in Sweden, Norway, Finland, Greece, Switzerland, and also charted in Belgium, Denmark, Ireland, Russia, Slovakia, the UK, and reaching #14 in the European Hot 100 chart, making it the second best-selling Eurovision entry of the year, only surpassed by Alexander Rybak's winning song "Fairytale".

The song was made available as a single, and included on the official Eurovision Song Contest album. Yohanna released an album in 2008, Butterflies and Elvis, which did not include the song as it had not yet been recorded; however, a limited edition of the album was released in 2009 which included "Is It True?".

Charts

Sales and certifications

References

External links

Lyrics from the official Eurovision website

Eurovision songs of 2009
Eurovision songs of Iceland
2009 songs
Number-one singles in Iceland